Roger Allen (born 1951) is Dean of St Peter's College, Oxford.  
A musicologist, he is also Tutor in Music and Official Fellow at St Peter's and Lecturer in Music at St Edmund Hall at the University of Oxford.

References

 

British musicologists
Fellows of St Peter's College, Oxford
Living people
1951 births
People associated with St Edmund Hall, Oxford